Birkdale is a suburb of Southport, Merseyside, England.

Birkdale may also refer to:

Places
Birkdale, Queensland, a suburb of Redland City, Australia
Birkdale, New Zealand, a suburb of Auckland
Birkdale (ward), an electoral ward in the Metropolitan Borough of Sefton, England
Birkdale, North Yorkshire, a dale in the Yorkshire Dales National Park, England
Birkdale Village, near Huntersville, North Carolina, USA

Other uses
Birkdale School, a school in Sheffield, United Kingdom
Royal Birkdale Golf Club, a golf course in Southport, Merseyside, England
Birkdale (ship) built 1892